The Samsung Galaxy A04 is a series of Android smartphones manufactured by Samsung Electronics. It was announced on August 24, 2022.

Specifications

Hardware 
The Samsung Galaxy A04 is equipped with a 6.5 in PLS LCD capacitive touchscreen with a resolution of 720 x 1600 (~270 ppi). The phone itself measures 164.4 x 76.3 x 9.1 mm (6.47 x 3.00 x 0.36 inches) and weighs 192 grams (6.77 oz). The A04 is constructed with a glass front and a plastic back and frame. This device is powered by the MediaTek Helio P35 (14nm) SoC with Octa-core (4x2.3 GHz Cortex-A53 & 4x1.8 GHz Cortex-A53) CPU and a PowerVR GE8320 GPU. The phone can have either 32 GB, 64 or 128 GB of internal storage as well as either 4, 6 or 8 GB of RAM. Internal storage can be expanded via a Micro SD card up to 512GB. The phone also includes a 3.5mm headphone jack. It has a non-removable 5000mAh lithium-ion battery.

Camera 
The Samsung Galaxy A04 has a dual-camera setup arranged vertically on the left side of the rear of the phone along with the flash. The main camera is a 50 MP wide lens and the second is a 2 MP depth sensor. The main camera can record video up at 1080p @ 30fps. A single 5 MP front-facing camera is present in a notch.

Software 
The Samsung Galaxy A04 comes with One UI Core 4.1 over Android 12.

References 

Samsung Galaxy
Mobile phones introduced in 2022
Android (operating system) devices
Samsung smartphones
Mobile phones with multiple rear cameras